Youssef Nabil was born on the 6th of  November 1972. He is an Egyptian artist and photographer. Youssef Nabil began his photography career in 1992.

Background
Born in Cairo, Egypt, Nabil started his photography career in 1992, shortly before leaving to New York and Paris to work in prominent photographers' studios. In 1999, Youssef Nabil had his first solo exhibition in Cairo. Through the years he remained a close friend with the Egyptian-Armenian studio portrait photographer Van Leo (Leon Boyadjian, 1921–2001), who encouraged Nabil to leave to the West. In 2003, Youssef Nabil was awarded the Seydou Keita Prize in the Biennial of African Photography in Bamako.

In 2001, while visiting Cairo, British artist Tracey Emin discovered Nabil's work and later nominated him as a future top artist in Harper's article Tomorrow People. Nabil left Egypt in 2003 for an artist residency at the Cité internationale des arts in Paris. In 2006, he moved to live and work in New York.

Many have been subject to Nabil's lens and distinctive technique of hand-colouring gelatin silver prints, including artists Tracey Emin, Gilbert and George, Nan Goldin, Marina Abramović, Louise Bourgeois, and Shirin Neshat; singers Alicia Keys, Sting (musician), and Natacha Atlas; actors Robert De Niro, Omar Sharif, Faten Hamama, Rossy de Palma, Charlotte Rampling, Isabelle Huppert, and Catherine Deneuve.

In 2010, Nabil wrote, produced and directed his first film You Never Left, an 8-minute short film with actors Fanny Ardant and Tahar Rahim. It is set in an allegorical place that is a metaphor of a lost Egypt, sketching an intimate and solemn parallel between exile and death. This video in which he reverently and inventively revisits the characteristics of Egyptian cinema’s golden age, with its movie stars and Technicolor film stock, he reconnects with the source and inspiration of his photographic imagery with which it shares the same personal, diaristic quality.

In 2015, Nabil produced his second video, I Saved My Belly Dancer, with actors Salma Hayek and Tahar Rahim, a narration around his fascination with the tradition of belly dancers and the disappearance of the art form that is unique to the Middle East. The 12-minute video also explores shifting perceptions of women in the Arab world and the tensions between the amplified sexualisation of their bodies and the continued repression of women in modern Arab society.

Nabil's work has been presented on numerous international solo and group exhibitions, at venues including the British Museum, London; Galleria dell'Accademia, Florence, The Los Angeles County Museum of Art, LACMA, MMK Museum für Modern Kunst, Frankfurt, MASP Museu de Arte de São Paulo, IVAM Institut Valencià d'Art Modern, Valencia, Museum of Anthropology, Vancouver, La Maison Rouge, Paris, Centro de la Imagen, Mexico City; North Carolina Museum of Art, Raleigh; BALTIC Centre for Contemporary Art, Newcastle, MACBA Centre de Cultura Contemporánea de Barcelona, Gemäldegalerie, Staatliche Museen zu Berlin, Museum of Photography, Thessaloniki, Victoria & Albert Museum, London, Biennale of the Visual Arts of Santa Cruz, Kunstmuseum, Bonn, Smithsonian National Museum of African Art, Washington, D.C, Institut du Monde Arabe, Paris; Savannah College of Art and Design, Savannah; Kunstmuseum, Bonn; The Third Line, Dubai; Galerist, Istanbul; Nathalie Obadia gallery, Paris; Yossi Milo gallery, New York; Centro Andaluz de Arte Contemporáneo, Sevilla; Aperture Foundation, New York, Villa Medici, Rome and Palazzo Grassi, Venice.

Youssef Nabil is part of various international collections including Collection François Pinault, Paris; LACMA Museum, Los Angeles; LVMH The Louis Vuitton Foundation, Paris; Sindika Dokolo Foundation, Luanda, La Maison Européenne de la Photographie, Paris; the joint collection of The British Museum and The Victoria & Albert Museum, London; SCAD Museum of Art, Savannah, GA, Centro de la Imagen, Mexico City; Mathaf Arab Museum of Modern Art, Doha; the Guggenheim Museum, Abu Dhabi; The Studio Museum in Harlem, New York and PAMM, Pérez Art Museum Miami.

Four monographs have been published on Youssef Nabil's work – Sleep in My Arms (Autograph ABP and Michael Stevenson, 2007), I Won't Let You Die (Hatje Cantz, 2008), Youssef Nabil ( Flammarion, 2013) and Once Upon A Dream ( Marsilio, 2020).

Nabil lives and works in Paris and New York City.

Films
 The Beautiful Voyage (2021) with Charlotte Rampling and Youssef Nabil
 Arabian Happy Ending (2016)
 I Saved My Belly Dancer (2015) with Salma Hayek and Tahar Rahim
 You Never Left (2010) with Fanny Ardant and Tahar Rahim

Selected exhibitions

Selected solo exhibitions
 2020 – Youssef Nabil, Once Upon A Dream, Palazzo Grassi, Venice, Italy.
 2019 – Youssef Nabil, Institut du Monde Arabe, Tourcoing, France.
 2017 – Deep Roots, Nathalie Obadia Gallery, Brussels, Belgium.
 2017 – I Saved My Belly Dancer, Pérez Art Museum Miami PAMM.
 2013 – Time of Transformation, The Third Line Gallery, Dubai. U.A.E.
 2012 – Youssef Nabil, Maison Européenne de la Photographie, Paris, France.
 2011 – You Never Left, Nathalie Obadia Gallery, Paris, France.
 2010 – Youssef Nabil, Yossi Milo Gallery, New York, U.S.
 2010 – I Live Within You, Savannah College of Art and Design-SCAD, Savannah, U.S.
 2009 – Youssef Nabil, GALERIST, Istanbul, Turkey.
 2009 – I Live Within You, Savannah College of Art and Design-SCAD, Atlanta, U.S.
 2009 – I Won't Let you Die, Villa Medici, Rome, Italy.
 2009 – I Will Go to Paradise, The Third Line Gallery, Dubai, U.A.E.
 2009 – Youssef Nabil, Volker Diehl Gallery, Berlin, Germany.
 2008 – CINEMA, Michael Stevenson Gallery, Cape Town, South Africa.
 2007 – Sleep in my arms, Michael Stevenson Gallery, Cape Town, South Africa.
 2007 – Portraits / Self-portraits, The Third Line Gallery, Dubai, U.A.E.
 2003 – Pour un Moment d'Éternité, Rencontres Internationales de la Photographie, Arles, France.
 2001 – Obsesiones, Centro de la Imagen, Mexico City, Mexico.
 2001 – Youssef Nabil, Townhouse Gallery of Contemporary Art, Cairo, Egypt.
 1999 – Premiere, Cairo-Berlin Art Gallery, Cairo, Egypt.

Selected group exhibitions
 2020 – Histories of Dance, MASP Museu de Arte de São Paulo, São Paulo, Brazil.
 2020 – Orientalisms, IVAM Institut Valencià d'Art Modern, Valencia, Spain.
 2019 – The 13th International Cairo Biennale, Cairo, Egypt.
 2018 – The Shapes of Birds: Contemporary Art of the Middle East and North Africa, Newport Art Museum, Rhode Island, U.S.
 2018 – BOTH, AND. Stevenson Gallery, Cape Town, South Africa.
 2018 – Beyond Words, 4th Mardin Biennial, Turkey
 2018 – Al Musiqa, Cité de la Musique – Philharmonie de Paris, Paris, France.
 2017 – Hips Don’t Lie, Centre Pompidou Paris, France
 2017 – A Painting Today, Stevenson Gallery, Cape Town, South Africa
 2016 – Looking at the World Around You, Fundación Banco Santander, Madrid, Spain.
 2016 – Hips Don’t Lie, Centre Pompidou Málaga, Spain
 2016 – The Blue Hour, Centro Cultural de Santa Cruz, Biennale of the Visual Arts of Santa Cruz, Bolivia.
 2016 – Portrait of the Artist as an Alter, FRAC Haute-Normandie, France.
 2016 – Dream Light, Pérez Art Museum Miami (PAMM), Miami, U.S.
 2016 – Botticelli Reimagined, Victoria and Albert Museum, London, UK
 2015 – The Botticelli Renaissance, Gemäldegalerie, Staatliche Museen zu Berlin, Berlin, Germany
 2015 – Home Ground, Aga Khan Museum of Art, Toronto, Canada.
 2015 – The Divine Comedy: Heaven, Purgatory, and Hell Revisited by Contemporary African Artists. Smithsonian National Museum of African Art, Washington, D.C, U.S.
 2015 – Islamic Art Now: Contemporary Art of the Middle East. The Los Angeles County Museum of Art, LACMA, LA, U.S.
 2014 – The Divine Comedy, Heaven, Hell, Purgatory Revisited by Contemporary African Artists, 
SCAD Museum of Art, Savannah, Georgia, U.S.
 2014 – The Divine Comedy, Heaven, Hell, Purgatory Revisited by Contemporary African Artists, 
MMK Museum für Modern Kunst, Frankfurt, Germany.
 2014 – Ri-conoscere Michelangelo, Galleria dell'Accademia, Florence, Italy.
 2013 – Tea with Nefertiti, IVAM Institut Valencia d'Art Modern, Valencia, Spain.
 2013 – Matisse à Nice, Palmiers, Palmes et Palmettes, Musée Masséna, Nice, France.
 2013 – Sous Influences, Arts Plastiques et Psychotropes, La Maison Rouge, Paris, France.
 2013 – Safar Voyage, Museum of Anthropology, Vancouver, Canada.
 2013 – Ici, Ailleurs, Friche la Belle de Mai, Marseille, France.
 2012 – Light from the Middle East: New Photography, Victoria & Albert Museum, London, U.K.
 2012 – The Royal Academy of Arts Encounter, Cultural Village Foundation Katara, Doha, Qatar.
 2012 – Tea with Nefertiti, Mathaf Arab Museum of Modern Art, Doha, Qatar.
 2012 – Édouard et Cléopâtre, Égyptomanies depuis le XIXe siècle, Boghossian Foundation, Brussels, Belgium.
 2012 – Pose/Re-Pose: Figurative Works Then and Now, SCAD Museum of Art, Savannah, Georgia, U.S.
 2011 – Facing Mirrors, Museum of Photography, Thessaloniki, Greece.
 2011 – Of Women's Modesty and Anger, Boghossian Foundation, Brussels, Belgium.
 2010 – Told, Untold, Retold, Mathaf Arab Museum of Modern Art, Doha, Qatar.
 2010 – Portraits, Galerie Nathalie Obadia, Brussels, Belgium.
 2009 – Unconditional Love, The Venice Biennale – 53rd International Art Exhibition, Venice, Italy.
 2009 – ARABESQUE, Arts of The Arab World, The Kennedy Center, Washington DC, U.S.
 2008 – Far From Home, North Carolina Museum of Art NCMA, North Carolina, U.S.
 2008 – Portraits II, Galeria Leme, São Paulo, Brazil.
 2008 – Last of the Dictionary Men, BALTIC Centre for Contemporary Art, Newcastle, U.K.
 2008 – Disguise, Michael Stevenson Gallery, Cape Town, South Africa.
 2008 – Regards des Photographes Arabes Contemporains, Musée National d'Art Moderne et Contemporain MNAMC, Alger, Algeria.
 2008 – Perfect Lovers, Art Extra, Johannesburg, South Africa.
 2007 – Gegenwart aus Jahrtausenden, Zeitgenössische Kunst aus Ägypten, Kunstmuseum, Bonn, Germany.
 2007 – Dialogues Méditerranéens, Saint-Tropez, France.
 2006 – Arabiske Blikke, GL Strand Museum, Copenhagen, Denmark.
 2006 – Word into Art, The British Museum, London, U.K.
 2006 – Images of the Middle East, Danish Center for Culture and Development, Copenhagen, Denmark.
 2006 – 19 miradas. Fotógrafos árabes contemporáneos, Centro Andaluz de Arte Contemporáneo, Sevilla, Spain.
 2005 – Regards des Photographes Arabes Contemporains, Institut du Monde Arabe, Paris, France.
 2005 – Nazar, Photographs from the Arab World, The Aperture Foundation Gallery, New York, U.S.
 2005 – L'Égypte, Saline Royale d'Arc et Senans, France.
 2005 – Arab Eyes, FotoFest Houston, Texas, U.S.
 2004 – Nazar: Noorderlicht, The Fries Museum, Leeuwaarden, The Netherlands.
 2004 – Rites sacrés, Rites profanes: Zeitgenossiche Afrikanische Fotographie, Kornhausforum, Bern, Switzerland.
 2004 – Staged Realities: Exposing the Soul in African Photography 1870–2004, Michael Stevenson Contemporary Gallery, Cape Town, South Africa.
 2004 – Bamako 03: Contemporary African Photography, Centre de Cultura Contemporània de Barcelona MACBA, Barcelona, Spain.
 2003 – Rites sacrés, Rites profanes, Rencontres Africaines de la Photographie, Bamako, Mali.

Publications

References

External links
 The Artist's website
 Youssef Nabil, rêves d'Égypte, Le Figaro article
 
 Youssef Nabil, Self-Portrait, Marseille
 Youssef Nabil

Living people
1972 births
Photographers from Cairo
Egyptian contemporary artists